Cycling '74 (also known as "C74" and stylized as '74) is an American software development company founded in 1997 by David Zicarelli, headquartered in San Francisco, California and owned by Ableton. The company employs the digital signal processing software tool, Max.

History
Cycling '74 (C74) was founded in 1997 by David Zicarelli to serve as the distributor for his various collections of software.  The company's website states that "the name Cycling '74 comes from a 1974 bicycle catalog from which some of the images that decorated our original site were inspired". The Wayback Machine provides an archive of the website from December 1998.

C74 began producing the MSP extension to Opcode Systems's 1990 program "Max" in the mid 1990s, and in 1998 started distributing the products together.  there is no longer a version of Max without audio processing.

In June 2017, Ableton announced they had acquired Cycling '74.

Products

Max

C74 is the distributor and developer of the Max/MSP digital signal processing environment.  The company has published the program since 1999, and in 2008 released Max 5, a major overhaul.  A Sound on Sound article (August 2008) covered its new software GUI.  The new interface was designed using Juce.  Aside from re-designed graphics, the development of the new system concentrated on the original code base, and provided integrated documentation and debugging.  With the release of Max 5, MSP and Jitter were included in the package.

MSP
MSP is a DSP plug-in for Max, allowing realtime audio synthesis.

Jitter
Jitter is a plug-in for Max released in 2003 that allows realtime manipulation of 3D graphics and video.

Pluggo
Pluggo was a Max extension that provided capabilities for VST design.  Pluggo was required to export Max "patches" for use in digital audio workstation (DAW) host environments, but was discontinued after the release of Max for Live.

Max for Live
Max was integrated into Ableton Live, developed by Ableton and Cycling ’74, to build unique synths and effects, create algorithmic composition tools, or fuse Live and controller hardware into new music machines. Unlike Pluggo, the device created with Max for Live can be edited directly from Live by pressing the edit button.

Record Label
Founded in 2000, c74 Music was created to release music produced using Cycling '74 technology.  The same year, the label released its first record - a live compilation album by the Freight Elevator Quartet.  The artist roster is:
DR.OX
Amoebazoid
Gregory Taylor
Crater
John Shirley
Leslie Stuck
Sarah Peebles
William Kleinsasser
Tetsu Inoue and Carl Stone
Kim Cascone
Amnon Wolman
Interface
The Freight Elevator Quartet

References 

Music technology
Companies based in San Francisco